Austria was represented by Westend, with the song "Hurricane", at the 1983 Eurovision Song Contest, which took place in Munich on 23 April. Westend was the winner of the Austrian national final for the contest, held on 17 March. The song was chosen through a national final organised by broadcaster ORF.

Before Eurovision

National final 
The final was held at the ORF TV Studios in Vienna, hosted by Brigitte Xander. The winning song was chosen by 328 people aged between 16 and 60. Waterloo represented Austria in  alongside Robinson.

At Eurovision 
On the night of the final Westend performed 18th in the running order, following Portugal and preceding Belgium. At the close of voting "Hurricane" placing Austria 9th of the 20 entries. The Austrian jury awarded its 12 points to the runner-up, Ofra Haza from Israel.

Voting

References 

1983
Countries in the Eurovision Song Contest 1983
Eurovision